Shorea polysperma is a species of flowering plant in the family Dipterocarpaceae. It is endemic to the Philippines.  It is threatened by habitat loss. The species is commonly known as tanguile in the Philippines.

References

polysperma
Endemic flora of the Philippines
Trees of the Philippines
Taxonomy articles created by Polbot
Taxa named by Francisco Manuel Blanco

Least concern plants